

References

G